Aivengo Rikadze is a Georgian Greco-Roman wrestler. He won the gold medal in the 82 kg event at the 2021 U23 World Wrestling Championships held in Belgrade, Serbia. He also won one of the bronze medals in the 82 kg event at the 2021 European Wrestling Championships held in Warsaw, Poland.

In 2019, he won one of the bronze medals in the 82 kg event at the World U23 Wrestling Championship held in Budapest, Hungary.

References

External links 
 

Living people
Year of birth missing (living people)
Place of birth missing (living people)
Male sport wrestlers from Georgia (country)
European Wrestling Championships medalists
21st-century people from Georgia (country)